Carsten Maple (born October 1971) is professor of cyber systems engineering at the University of Warwick. He was previously professor of applicable computing at the University of Bedfordshire. He is a fellow of the British Computer Society and vice-chair of the Council of Professors and Heads of Computing, UK. He is also co-director of the National Centre for Cyberstalking Research and a trustee of Protection Against Stalking.

References

External links

Academics of the University of Warwick
Alumni of the University of Leicester
German computer scientists
Fellows of the British Computer Society
Living people
1971 births